Grace Kobilo Kiptui (born 1967) is a Kenyan politician who served as the woman representative of Baringo County from 2013 until 2017. A member of the United Republican Party, she was elected in the 2013 elections. She is sometimes called "Mama County".

Early life and education

She was born and brought up in Kiboino, a town near Kabarnet. She was educated at Kiboino Primary School and Kituro Boarding Primary School. In 1977, she joined Kapropita Girls' High School for her O-levels before proceeding to Bishop Gatimu Ngandu Girls' High School in 1981. She studied law at the University of Nairobi, graduating with a Bachelor of Laws in 1987. In 1988, she enrolled at the Kenya School of Law for a postgraduate law diploma.

Professional career

Kiptui entered public service as a legal officer in the Attorney General's Chambers. Between 1993 and 2012, she worked in private practice as an advocate. She is a principal partner at Kiptui Kipkemei & Co. Advocates.

Radio talk show

Since 2006, Kobilo has hosted a radio talk show on Kass FM educating the community on vital legal issues.

Political career

Kiptui was elected the woman representative of Baringo County in the 2013 elections. She won by a landslide, garnering over 120,000 votes against Kaptuiya Cheboiwo's 25,000.

Campaign against female genital mutilation

She is a vocal campaigner against the practice of female genital mutilation and a champion of women empowerment.

Anti-jigger campaign
In conjunction with Ahadi Kenya Trust], a non-governmental organization, Kiptui has spearheaded a gampaign against the jigger flea all over the county. The first phase of the programme covered the highland areas of Baringo Central Constituency and Baringo North Constituency.

Personal life

She is married to Daudi Kiptui. They have three children.

References

External links
http://info.mzalendo.com/person/grace-jemutai-kiptui/

1967 births
Living people
20th-century Kenyan lawyers
United Republican Party (Kenya) politicians
University of Nairobi alumni
Alumni of Bishop Gatimu Ngandu Girls High School
21st-century Kenyan lawyers
Kenyan women lawyers